Sir Ellis Jones Ellis-Griffith, 1st Baronet, PC, KC (23 May 1860 – 30 November 1926) was a British barrister and radical Liberal politician. He was born Ellis Jones Griffith.

Family and education
Griffith was the only child of Thomas Morris Griffith (1827-1901), a master builder, and his wife Jane (née Jones) (1823-1881). Both his parents were Welsh, but had been living in Birmingham and the time of his birth, before moving to Brynsiencyn when Griffith was a child.

He was initially educated at the Holt Academy, and passed both the Cambridge & Oxford local examinations in 1873. The following year he passed a scholarship examination for the University College, Aberystwyth, where he began studying in 1876. He took an arts degree at the University of London in 1879, graduating with double honours in English and Philosophy, before moving to Downing College, Cambridge, in 1880, where he read law and was President of the Cambridge Union.

Ellis-Griffith married Mary (1862-1941), daughter of Robert Owen, in 1892. They had two sons and one daughter. The couple's only surviving son, Ellis succeeded in the baronetcy after his father's death, but died without issue in 1934.

Legal career
Griffith was called to the Bar, Middle Temple, in 1887 and worked on the North Wales and Chester Circuit. Among his most notable cases was his defence of Major Spilsbury in the Gibraltar Tourmaline smuggling case in 1898. He was a Recorder of Birkenhead from 1907 to 1912 and was appointed a King's Counsel in 1910.

Political career
Griffith initially stood unsuccessfully for West Toxteth in 1892 but in 1895 was successfully returned to Parliament for Anglesey. He was returned unopposed in 1900.

Upon his appointment as Recorder of Birkenhead in 1907 he was required to re-submit himself to his electorate at Anglesey and was returned unopposed. Whilst an MP he voted in favour of the 1908 Women's Enfranchisement Bill. He served in the Liberal administration of H. H. Asquith as Under-Secretary of State for the Home Department from 1912 to 1915, in which position he played an important role in steering the Welsh Disestablishment Bill through the House of Commons, and was sworn of the Privy Council in 1914. In 1918 he was created a baronet, of Llanidan in the County of Anglesey and changed his surname to Ellis-Griffith.

He was narrowly defeated at Anglesey in the 1918 general election by the Labour candidate Owen Thomas.  He then unsuccessfully contested the University of Wales constituency in 1922, before returning to the House of Commons in 1923, when he was elected for Carmarthen, but he resigned the seat the following year, citing personal unfulfillment in his parliamentary career.

Personal life & death 
In November 1926, Ellis-Griffith (who had previously suffered small bouts of ill health) was in Swansea, as defence in a manslaughter case at the assizes court. It was noted during the day that Griffith appeared unwell, and after retiring to his room at the Metropole Hotel that evening, he was found by two colleagues, in great pain, on the floor. Despite receiving medical treatment, he died at the scene, aged 66. His wife, Jane, was in the Italian Riviera at the time of his death, and was brought home shortly afterwards. The cause of death was later ruled as apoplexy. He was buried at St Nidan's Church, Llanidan on the 4 December.

Election results 

He was returned unopposed in 1900.

References

Archives Network Wales
Welsh Biography Online

External links 
 
 Monument to Sir Ellis Ellis-Griffith, 1st Baronet, at Brynsiencyn Church
 

1860 births
1926 deaths
Baronets in the Baronetage of the United Kingdom
Alumni of Aberystwyth University
Alumni of the University of London
Alumni of Downing College, Cambridge
Presidents of the Cambridge Union
Liberal Party (UK) MPs for Welsh constituencies
UK MPs 1895–1900
UK MPs 1900–1906
UK MPs 1906–1910
UK MPs 1910
UK MPs 1910–1918
UK MPs 1923–1924
Welsh barristers
Members of the Inner Temple
Members of the Privy Council of the United Kingdom
Members of the Parliament of the United Kingdom for Carmarthenshire constituencies